Aniyan Bava Chetan Bava is a 1995 Indian Malayalam-language comedy-drama film directed by Rajasenan and written by Rafi Mecartin. It stars Jayaram, Narendra Prasad, Rajan P. Dev, Kasturi and Sangita. The movie was remade in Telugu as Subhamastu and in Tamil as Periya Idathu Mappillai, the latter starring Jayaram himself in the lead role. It was the debut movie of K. T. S. Padannayil.

Plot
The film follows brothers Kuttan Bava/Chettan Bava and Kunjan Bava/Aniyan Bava, and their driver Premachandran, with whom the daughters of both the Bavas fall in love. This makes the Bavas enemies and it becomes their issue of pride on who will marry Premachandran. On top of this includes Sundaran, the nephew of the Bavas trying to take Premachandran down.

Cast
 Jayaram as Premachandran
 Narendra Prasad as Kuttan Bava (Chettan Bava)
 Rajan P. Dev as Kunjan Bava (Aniyan Bava)
 Kasturi as Ammu
 Sangita as Malu
 Prem Kumar as Sundaran
 Oduvil Unnikrishnan as Easwara Pillai
 Janardanan as Kottaram Veedan
 Rizabawa as Kannappan
 Appa Haja as Dassappan
 Indrans as Balan
 Meena as Kunjan Bava's wife and Malu's mother
 Paravoor Bharathan as Premachandran's father
 Kanakalatha as Devi Thampuratti, Premachandran's mother
 K. T. S. Padannayil as Premachandran's great-grandfather
 Adoor Bhavani as Premachandran's great-grandmother
 M. S. Thripunithura as College Professor (Cameo)
 Reshmi Soman as Seetha, Premachandran's sister

Soundtrack
Aniyan Bava Chetan Bava's songs and background score were composed by S. P. Venkatesh, with lyrics by S. Ramesan Nair and I. S. Kundoor. The music album has 5 songs:

Remakes
The film was remade in Telugu as Shubhamastu (1995) and in Tamil as Periya Idathu Mappillai (1997) with Jayaram.

Box office
The film was declared a hit. The film ran for  more than 100 days in theaters

References

External links
 

1990s Malayalam-language films
Indian romantic comedy-drama films
1990s romantic comedy-drama films
1995 films
Indian musical comedy-drama films
1990s musical comedy-drama films
Malayalam films remade in other languages
1990s romantic musical films
Indian romantic musical films
Films directed by Rajasenan
1995 comedy films
1995 drama films